Lilian Compan (born 30 April 1977) is a French football manager and former player who played as a striker. After his playing career, Compan was contracted by former club AS Saint-Etienne in a variety of roles, from scout to U19 team head coach. He eventually resigned to take over the position of manager of SC Hyeres in French fourth tier.

References

External links

1977 births
Living people
Sportspeople from Hyères
French footballers
Footballers from Provence-Alpes-Côte d'Azur
Association football forwards
France youth international footballers
Ligue 1 players
Ligue 2 players
Hyères FC players
AS Cannes players
AJ Auxerre players
LB Châteauroux players
US Créteil-Lusitanos players
AS Saint-Étienne players
Stade Malherbe Caen players
Montpellier HSC players